Sami Pasha al-Farouqi (1861–1911) was an Ottoman statesman. He was born in Baghdad in 1861. He graduated from Turkish Military Academy and the War Academy in Istanbul and joined the army in 1887 as a staff captain. He served as an attaché in Berlin for a long time. He was assigned to suppress a rebellion in Yemen. In 1906, he was the leader of Turkish troops in Al-Qassim which eventually had to withdraw from the region under pressure from Al Saud.

On December 27, 1908, he was appointed as a member of the Senate. Between 1908 and April 16th, 1909, he served as the Minister of Zaptiye. He was appointed as the commander of the army formed to suppress the Hauran Druze Rebellion. He fell ill during the suppression of the rebellion and died in Damascus in 1911.

Notes

References 

Ottoman Military Academy alumni
1911 deaths
1861 births